The House That Jazz Built is a 1921 American drama film directed by Penrhyn Stanlaws and written by Douglas Bronston. The film stars Wanda Hawley, Forrest Stanley, Gladys George, Helen Lynch, Clarence Geldart and Helen Dunbar. The film was released in April 1921, by Realart Pictures Corporation.

Cast   
Wanda Hawley as Cora Rodham
Forrest Stanley as Frank Rodham
Gladys George as Lila Drake
Helen Lynch as Kitty Estabrook
Clarence Geldart as Mr. Estabrook 
Helen Dunbar as Mrs. Drake
Robert Bolder as Mr. Foster

References

External links
 

1921 films
1920s English-language films
Silent American drama films
1921 drama films
American silent feature films
American black-and-white films
Films directed by Penrhyn Stanlaws
1920s American films